Amaral is the first studio album by the Spanish folk rock group Amaral released in 1998 in Spain.

Track listing 
All tracks composed by Amaral.
 "Rosita" (Rosita) – 2:55
 "Un día más" (One more day) - 4:21
 "Voy a acabar contigo" (I'm gonna finish with you) -  3:52
 "Cara a cara" (Face to face) -  3:23
 "Tardes" (Afternoons) -  4:06
 "No existen los milagros" (Miracles do not exist) -  3:41
 "Lo quiero oír de tu boca" (I want to hear it from your mouth) -  3:35
 "Habla" (Talk) -  3:17
 "1997" (1997) -  3:36
 "Dile a la rabia" (Tell the anger) -  4:30
 "Soy lo que soy" (I am what I am) -  3:18
 "No sé que hacer con mi vida" (I don't know what to do with my life) -  3:01
 "Mercado negro" (Black market) -  4:46

References

1998 debut albums
Amaral (band) albums